Alan Morton Dershowitz (born September 1, 1938) is an American lawyer and former law professor known for his work in U.S. constitutional law and American criminal law. From 1964 to 2013, he taught at Harvard Law School, where he was appointed the Felix Frankfurter Professor of Law in 1993. Dershowitz is a regular media contributor, political commentator, and legal analyst.

Dershowitz is known for taking on high-profile and often unpopular causes and clients. As of 2009, he had won 13 of the 15 murder and attempted murder cases he handled as a criminal appellate lawyer. Dershowitz has represented such celebrity clients as Mike Tyson, Patty Hearst, Leona Helmsley, Julian Assange, and Jim Bakker. Major legal victories have included two successful appeals that overturned convictions, first for Harry Reems in 1976, then in 1984 for Claus von Bülow, who had been convicted of the attempted murder of his wife, Sunny. In 1995, Dershowitz served as the appellate adviser on the O. J. Simpson murder trial, part of the legal "Dream Team", alongside Johnnie Cochran and F. Lee Bailey. He was a member of Harvey Weinstein's defense team in 2018 and of President Donald Trump's defense team in his first impeachment trial in 2020. He was a member of Jeffrey Epstein's defense team and helped to negotiate a 2006 non-prosecution agreement on Epstein's behalf. 

Dershowitz is the author of several books about politics and the law, including Reversal of Fortune: Inside the von Bülow Case (1985), the basis of the 1990 film; Chutzpah (1991); Reasonable Doubts: The Criminal Justice System and the O.J. Simpson Case (1996); The Case for Israel (2003); and The Case for Peace (2005). His two most recent works are The Case Against Impeaching Trump (2018) and Guilt by Accusation: The Challenge of Proving Innocence in the Age of #MeToo (2019). An ardent Zionist and supporter of Israel, he has written several books on the Arab–Israeli conflict.

Early life
Dershowitz was born in Williamsburg, Brooklyn, on September 1, 1938, the son of Claire (née Ringel) and Harry Dershowitz, an Orthodox Jewish couple. He was raised in Borough Park. His father was a founder and president of the Young Israel of Boro Park Synagogue in the 1960s, served on the board of directors of the Etz Chaim School in Borough Park, and in retirement was co-owner of the Manhattan-based Merit Sales Company. Dershowitz's first job was at a deli factory on Manhattan's Lower East Side in 1952, at age 14.

Education

Dershowitz attended Yeshiva University High School, an independent boys' prep school owned by Yeshiva University, in Manhattan, where he played on the basketball team. He was a rebellious student, often criticized by his teachers. He later said his teachers told him to do something that "requires a big mouth and no brain ... so I became a lawyer". After graduating from high school, he attended Brooklyn College and received his A.B. in 1959, majoring in political science. Next, he attended Yale Law School, where he was editor-in-chief of the Yale Law Journal, and graduated first in his class with a Bachelor of Laws (LL.B.) in 1962. He was a member of a Conservative minyan at Harvard Hillel but is a secular Jew.

Legal and teaching career 

After graduating from law school, Dershowitz clerked for David L. Bazelon, the chief judge of the U.S. Court of Appeals for the District of Columbia Circuit. Dershowitz described Bazelon as an influential mentor. He has said, "Bazelon was my best and worst boss at once.... He worked me to the bone; he didn't hesitate to call at 2 a.m. He taught me everything—how to be a civil libertarian, a Jewish activist, a mensch. He was halfway between a slave master and a father figure." From 1963 to 1964 Dershowitz clerked for the Justice Arthur Goldberg of the U.S. Supreme Court.

He told Tom Van Riper of Forbes that getting a Supreme Court clerkship was probably his second big break. His first was at age 14 or 15, when a camp counselor told him he was smart but that his mind operated a little differently. He joined the Harvard Law School faculty as an assistant professor in 1964, and was made a full professor in 1967 at age 28, at that time the youngest full professor of law in the school's history. He was appointed Felix Frankfurter professor of law in 1993. Dershowitz retired from teaching at Harvard Law in 2013. He is a Distinguished Senior Fellow at the Gatestone Institute.

Throughout his tenure at Harvard, Dershowitz maintained his legal practice in both criminal and civil law. His clients have included such high-profile figures as Patty Hearst, Harry Reems, Leona Helmsley, Jim Bakker, Mike Tyson, Michael Milken, O.J. Simpson and Kirtanananda Swami. Dershowitz reportedly was one of Nelson Mandela's lawyers.

Notable clients

Harry Reems (1976) 
In 1976, Dershowitz handled the successful appeal of Harry Reems, who had been convicted of distribution of obscenity resulting from acting in the pornographic movie Deep Throat. Dershowitz argued against censorship of pornography on First Amendment grounds and maintained that consumption of pornography was not harmful.

Claus von Bülow (1984)

In one of his first high-profile cases, Dershowitz represented Claus von Bülow, a British socialite, at his appeal for the attempted murder of his wife, Sunny von Bülow, who went into a coma in Newport, Rhode Island, in 1980 (and later died in 2008). He succeeded in having the conviction overturned, and von Bülow was acquitted in a retrial. Dershowitz told the story of the case in his book Reversal of Fortune: Inside the von Bülow case (1985), which was adapted into a movie in 1990. Dershowitz was played by actor Ron Silver, and Dershowitz himself had a cameo as a judge.

In his book Taking the Stand, Dershowitz recounts that von Bülow had a dinner party after he was found not guilty at his retrial. Dershowitz told him that he would not attend if it was a "victory party," and von Bülow assured him that it was only a dinner for "several interesting friends." Norman Mailer attended the dinner where, among other things, Dershowitz explained why the evidence pointed to von Bülow's innocence. Dershowitz described Mailer grabbing his wife's arm and saying: "Let's get out of here. I think this guy is innocent. I thought we were going to be having dinner with a man who actually tried to kill his wife. This is boring."

Avi Weiss (1989) 
In 1989, Dershowitz filed a defamation suit against Cardinal Józef Glemp, then Archbishop of Warsaw, on behalf of Rabbi Avi Weiss. That summer, Weiss and six other members of the Jewish community in New York had staged a protest at the Auschwitz concentration camp over the presence of a controversial convent of Carmelite nuns. Weiss and the protesters were ejected after attempting to scale a wall surrounding the convent. In an August 1989 speech, Glemp referenced the incident and ascribed a violent intent to the protesters, saying, "Recently, a squad of seven Jews from New York launched an attack on the convent at Oswiecim [Auschwitz]. They did not kill the nuns or destroy the convent only because they were stopped." In the same speech, Glemp made antisemitic remarks suggesting that Jews control the news media. Dershowitz's suit centered on these statements. His account of the lawsuit appears in his 1991 book Chutzpah.

O. J. Simpson (1995)
In the O. J. Simpson murder case, Dershowitz acted as an appellate adviser to Simpson's defense team during the trial, and later wrote a book about it, Reasonable Doubts: The Criminal Justice System and the O. J. Simpson Case (1996). Dershowitz wrote: "the Simpson case will not be remembered in the next century. It will not rank as one of the trials of the century. It will not rank with the Nuremberg trials, the Rosenberg trial, Sacco and Vanzetti. It is on par with Leopold and Loeb and the Lindbergh case, all involving celebrities. It is also not one of the most important cases of my own career. I would rank it somewhere in the middle in terms of interest and importance." The case has been described as the most publicized criminal trial in American history.

Jeffrey Epstein (2008)
Dershowitz was a member of the legal defense team for the first criminal case against Jeffrey Epstein, who was investigated after accusations that he had repeatedly solicited sex from minors. Dershowitz had previously befriended Epstein through their mutual acquaintance Lynn Forester de Rothschild.

The first investigation into Epstein concluded with a controversial non-prosecution agreement that Dershowitz helped negotiate on Epstein's behalf. On June 30, 2008, after Epstein pleaded guilty to a state charge (one of two) of procuring for prostitution a girl below age 18, he was sentenced to 18 months in prison.

Julian Assange (2011) 
In 2011, Dershowitz served as a consultant for Julian Assange's legal team while Assange was facing the prospect of charges from the U.S. government for distributing classified documents through WikiLeaks. Of his decision to engage with Assange's team, Dershowitz said that Assange should be considered a journalist, adding, "I believe that to protect the First Amendment we need to protect new electronic media vigorously."

Harvey Weinstein (2018)

In May 2018, Dershowitz joined Harvey Weinstein's legal team as a consultant for Weinstein's lawyer Benjamin Brafman. Dershowitz advised the team on obtaining documents from The Weinstein Company related to the sexual abuse allegations against Weinstein.

Donald Trump (2020)

In January 2020, Dershowitz joined President Donald Trump's legal team as Trump was being tried on impeachment charges in the Senate. Dershowitz's addition to the team was notable, as commentators pointed out that he was a Hillary Clinton supporter and had offered occasionally controversial television defenses of Trump in the preceding two years. The statement announcing Dershowitz's joining the team said that Dershowitz was "nonpartisan when it comes to the Constitution." Dershowitz said he would not accept any compensation, and if he was paid anything, he would donate it to charity. He defended his representation of Trump, which was controversial among Trump critics, saying, "I'm there to try to defend the integrity of the constitution. That benefits President Trump in this case." Dershowitz said that his role would be limited to presenting oral arguments before the Senate opposing impeachment.

In his oral arguments, Dershowitz said that proof of a crime is required to impeach a president. Some commentators suggested that his position contradicted his statements during the impeachment of Bill Clinton, when he said no proof of a crime was required. Dershowitz later retracted his statements made during the Clinton era, saying, "To the extent there are inconsistencies between my current position and what I said 22 years ago, I am correct today". "During the Clinton impeachment, the issue was not whether a technical crime was required, because he was charged with perjury."

Some of his comments were considered to represent an overly expansive view of executive power. He argued, "If a president does something which he believes will help him get elected in the public interest, that cannot be the kind of quid pro quo that results in impeachment." Dershowitz later said his comment was mischaracterized: "a president seeking reelection cannot do anything he wants. He is not above the law. He cannot commit crimes."

After the trial, Dershowitz used his ties with the Trump administration to lobby it to give clemency to various Dershowitz clients. He played a role in at least 12 clemency grants, as well as unsuccessfully lobbying the administration to commute the 10-year sentence of George Nader, who had pleaded guilty to child pornography and sex trafficking.

Political views, writings, and commentary

Dershowitz is a member of the Democratic Party. In 2016, he said that if Keith Ellison were appointed party chair, he would leave the party; Tom Perez was appointed instead. Dershowitz endorsed Hillary Clinton in the 2008 presidential election, and later endorsed the nominee, Barack Obama. He opposed the impeachment of Bill Clinton and said that he voted for Hillary Clinton in the 2016 presidential election. Dershowitz campaigned against Trump during the 2016 election and has been critical of many of his actions, including his travel ban, his rescission of protections for "Dreamers", and his failure to single out white nationalists for their provocations during protests in Charlottesville. Comparing Trump unfavorably to Hillary Clinton in October 2016, Dershowitz said, "I think there's no comparison between who has engaged in more corruption and who is more likely to continue that if elected President of the United States."

Commentary on Trump
Dershowitz has offered commentary on Trump's legal issues that has been polarizing among liberals and Democrats, as he has often been perceived as offering defenses of Trump's more controversial actions. Dershowitz has maintained that his weighing in is apolitical, saying, "I am a liberal Democrat in politics, but a neutral civil libertarian when it comes to the Constitution."

In January 2018, Dershowitz said that attacking Trump's mental fitness was a "very dangerous" line of attack and that there was "no case" that Trump committed obstruction of justice by firing former FBI Director James Comey. He called the indictment of Michael Flynn the strangest he had ever seen because Flynn lied about something that was not illegal, and claimed that "collusion" in reference to Russian meddling in the 2016 election is not a crime. But Dershowitz said that Trump's alleged disclosure of classified information to Russia is "the most serious charge ever made against a sitting president". His 2018 book The Case Against Impeaching Trump argues against impeachment.

Dershowitz has received some criticism from liberals and praise from conservatives for his comments on these issues. He defended Supreme Court nominee Brett Kavanaugh against accusations by Julie Swetnick that Kavanaugh and Mark Judge were at a party where she was gang-raped. Dershowitz said on Fox News, "that affidavit is so deeply flawed and so open-ended that any good lawyer, any good defense attorney would be able to tear that apart in 30 seconds". Dershowitz called on Swetnick's lawyer Michael Avenatti, who was also representing Stormy Daniels, to withdraw the affidavit because of inconsistencies.

Dershowitz and others recommended that Trump commute Sholom Rubashkin's sentence for bank fraud in the Agriprocessors case.

In 2019, Dershowitz said he would "enthusiastically support Joe Biden" for president.

In 2021, Dershowitz said that Trump's rally preceding the 2021 storming of the United States Capitol was "constitutionally protected" speech. He said it would be his "honor and privilege" to defend Trump in a trial. Trump reportedly considered him for his defense team.

Criticism of the American Civil Liberties Union 
In June 2018, Dershowitz wrote an op-ed criticizing the American Civil Liberties Union, alleging that it had become a hyper-partisan organization and was no longer the nonpartisan group of politically diverse individuals sharing a commitment to core civil liberties it once was. He wrote, "The move of the ACLU to the hard-left reflects an even more dangerous and more general trend in the United States: the right is moving further right; the left is moving farther left, and the center is shrinking... The ACLU's move from the neutral protector of civil liberties to a partisan advocate of hard-left politics is both a symptom and consequence of this change." He also criticized Trump, writing that by denying fundamental civil liberties, he was also to blame for pushing the ACLU further into partisan politics.

Presidential candidates 
During the 2008 Democratic Party primaries, Dershowitz endorsed Hillary Clinton, calling her "a progressive on social issues, a realist on foreign policy, a pragmatist on the economy". In 2012, he strongly supported Barack Obama's reelection, writing, "President Obama has earned my vote on the basis of his excellent judicial appointments, his consensus-building foreign policy, and the improvements he has brought about in the disastrous economy he inherited." In 2018, after a photo with Obama and Nation of Islam leader Louis Farrakhan at a 2005 meeting of the Congressional Black Caucus emerged, Dershowitz said he would never have campaigned for Obama had the photo been publicized soon after it was taken.

In the 2020 Democratic Party primaries, Dershowitz endorsed Joe Biden. He said: "I'm a strong supporter of Joe Biden. I like Joe Biden. I've liked him for a long time, and I could enthusiastically support Joe Biden." He criticized Bernie Sanders, saying: "I don't think under any circumstances I could vote for a man who went to England and campaigned for a bigot and anti-Semite like Jeremy Corbyn."

Israel and the Middle East 
Dershowitz is a strong supporter of Israel. He self-identifies as both "pro-Israel and pro-Palestine," writing, "I want to see a vibrant, democratic, economically viable, peaceful Palestinian state existing side by side with Israel." He has said, "were I an Israeli, I'd be a person of the left and voting the left". He also criticized President Obama's foreign policy stance toward Israel after the U.S. abstained from voting on United Nations Security Council Resolution 2334, which condemned Israel for building Israeli settlements in the occupied Palestinian territory. He has said, "I will not be a member of a party that represents itself through a chairman like Keith Ellison and through policies like that espoused by John Kerry and Barack Obama."

Dershowitz had a contract to provide advice to Joey Allaham, a lobbyist working for the Qatari government. In January 2018, Dershowitz questioned claims that Qatar funds terrorist groups, including Hamas, which is designated as a terrorist organization by several countries, including Israel, the U.S., and the European Union. Dershowitz wrote, "Qatar is quickly becoming the Israel of the Gulf States, surrounded by enemies, subject to boycotts and unrealistic demands, and struggling for its survival."

Dershowitz has engaged in public debates with several other commentators, including Meir Kahane, Noam Chomsky, and Norman Finkelstein. When former U.S. President Jimmy Carter published his book Palestine: Peace Not Apartheid (2006) – in which he argues that Israel's control of Palestinian land is the primary obstacle to peace – Dershowitz challenged Carter to a debate at Brandeis University. Carter declined, saying, "I don't want to have a conversation even indirectly with Dershowitz. There is no need to debate somebody who, in my opinion, knows nothing about the situation in Palestine." Carter did address Brandeis in January 2007, but only Brandeis students and staff were allowed to attend. Dershowitz was invited to respond on the same stage only after Carter had left. He authored an editorial in the Israeli newspaper The Jerusalem Post accusing Alice Walker of bigotry for refusing to have her novel The Color Purple published by an Israeli firm.

In April 2009, Dershowitz took part in the Doha Debates at Georgetown University, where he spoke against the motion "this House believes it's time for the US to get tough on Israel" with Dore Gold, President of the Jerusalem Center for Public Affairs. Speakers for the motion were Avraham Burg, former chair of the Jewish Agency for Israel and former Speaker of the Knesset; and Michael Scheuer, former chief of the CIA Bin Laden Issue Station. Dershowitz's side lost the debate, with 63% of the audience voting for the motion.

In 2006, Dershowitz argued for the prosecution of Iranian president Mahmoud Ahmedinejad for incitement to genocide based on his threat of "wiping Israel off the map". His 2015 book The Case Against the Iran Deal argues that the Supreme Leader of Iran, Ali Khamenei, had urged the Iranian military "to have two nuclear bombs ready to go off in January 2005 or you're not Muslims". On February 29, 2012, Dershowitz filed an amicus brief in support of delisting the People's Mujahedin of Iran (MEK) from the State Department list of foreign terrorist organizations.

Of civilian casualties, Dershowitz has said, "In the age of terrorism, when militants don't wear uniforms, don't belong to regular armies, and easily blend into civilian populations," civilian casualties should be reexamined in terms of a "continuum of civilianality." In one example, he writes: "There is a vast difference – both moral and legal – between a 2-year-old who is killed by an enemy rocket and a 30-year-old civilian who has allowed his house to be used to store Katyusha rockets."

Harvard-MIT divestment petition 

Randall Adams of The Harvard Crimson wrote that, in the spring of 2002, a petition calling for Harvard and MIT to divest from Israeli and American companies that sell arms to Israel gathered over 600 signatures, including 74 from Harvard faculty and 56 from MIT faculty. Among the signatories was Harvard's Winthrop House Master Paul D. Hanson, in response to which Dershowitz staged a debate for 200 students in the Winthrop Junior Common Room. He called the petition's signatories antisemitic bigots and said they knew nothing about the Middle East. "Your House master is a bigot", he told the students, "and you ought to know that." Adams wrote that Dershowitz cited examples of human rights violations in countries that the U.S. supports, such as the execution of homosexuals in Egypt and the repression of women in Saudi Arabia, and said he would sue any professor who voted against the tenure of another academic because of the candidate's position on Israel, calling them "ignoramuses with PhDs".

New response to Palestinian terrorism (2002) suggestion 
In March 2002, Dershowitz published an article in The Jerusalem Post titled "New Response to Palestinian Terrorism". In it, he wrote that Israel should announce a unilateral cessation in retaliation, at the end of which it would "announce precisely what it will do in response to the next act of terrorism. For example, it could announce the first act of terrorism following the moratorium will result in the destruction of a small village which has been used as a base for terrorist operations. The residents would be given 24 hours to leave, and then, troops will come in and bulldoze all of the buildings." The list of targets would be made public in advance. The proposal attracted criticism from within Harvard University and beyond. James Bamford argued in The Washington Post that it would violate international law. Norman Finkelstein wrote, "it is hard to make out any difference between the policy Dershowitz advocates and the Nazi destruction of Lidice, for which he expresses abhorrence – except that Jews, not Germans, would be implementing it".

2006 Israel–Lebanon conflict 
In July 2006, Dershowitz wrote a series of articles defending the Israel Defense Forces' conduct during the 2006 Israel–Lebanon conflict. There was an international outcry at the time over escalating Lebanese civilian deaths and the destruction of civilian infrastructure resulting from Israel's stated attempt to weaken or destroy Hezbollah. After UN High Commissioner for Human Rights Louise Arbour indicated that Israeli officials might be investigated and indicted for war crimes, Dershowitz called her statement "bizarre", called for her dismissal, and wrote about what he called the "absurdity and counterproductive nature of current international law". In an op-ed several days later in The Boston Globe, he argued that Israel was not to blame for civilian deaths: "Israel has every self-interest in minimizing civilian casualties, whereas the terrorists have every self-interest in maximizing them – on both sides. Israel should not be condemned for doing what every democracy would and should do: taking every reasonable military step to stop the killing of their own civilians."

2nd Amendment and gun control 
Dershowitz is a strong supporter of gun control. He has criticized the Second Amendment to the United States Constitution, saying that it has "no place in modern society". Dershowitz supports repealing the amendment, but vigorously opposes using the judicial system to read it out of the Constitution because that would open the way for further revisions to the Bill of Rights and Constitution by the courts. "Foolish liberals who are trying to read the Second Amendment out of the Constitution by claiming it's not an individual right or that it's too much of a public safety hazard don't see the danger in the big picture. They're courting disaster by encouraging others to use the same means to eliminate portions of the Constitution they don't like."

Takings Clause, 5th and 14th Amendments (business law) 
Dershowitz took on a case of a 1% shareholder of the TransPerfect company and argued that the Takings Clause of the Fifth Amendment and Due Process under both the 5th and 14th Amendments apply to individuals even in a corporate issue. He is an attorney for defendant Shirley Shawe and is looking to take the case of the Delaware Chancery's forced sale of TransPerfect away from its shareholders to the Supreme Court. Dershowitz has argued that the Delaware Chancery court violated the personal rights of an individual shareholder when it ordered the public auction on the company.

Torture 
After the September 11 attacks, Dershowitz published an article in the San Francisco Chronicle titled "Want to Torture? Get a Warrant", in which he advocated the issuance of warrants permitting the torture of terrorism suspects if there were an "absolute need to obtain immediate information in order to save lives coupled with probable cause that the suspect had such information and is unwilling to reveal it". He argued that authorities should be permitted to use non-lethal torture in a ticking time bomb scenario and that it would be less destructive to the rule of law to regulate the process than to leave it to individual law-enforcement agents' discretion. He favors preventing the government from prosecuting the subject of torture based on information revealed during such an interrogation. A play based on the scenario by Robert Fothergill was named after Dershowitz.

William F. Schulz, executive director of the U.S. section of Amnesty International, found Dershowitz's ticking-bomb scenario unrealistic because, he argued, it would require that "the authorities know that a bomb has been planted somewhere; know it is about to go off; know that the suspect in their custody has the information they need to stop it; know that the suspect will yield that information accurately in a matter of minutes if subjected to torture; and know that there is no other way to obtain it". James Bamford of The Washington Post described one of the practices mentioned by Dershowitz – the "sterilized needle being shoved under the fingernails" – as "chillingly Nazi-like".

Animal rights 
Dershowitz is one of several scholars at Harvard Law School who have expressed their support for limited animal rights. In his Rights from Wrongs: A Secular Theory of the Origins of Rights (2004), he writes that, in order to prevent human beings from treating each other the way we treat animals, we have made what he calls the "somewhat arbitrary decision" to single out our own species for different and better treatment. "Does this subject us to the charge of speciesism? Of course it does, and we cannot justify it, except by the fact that in the world in which we live, humans make the rules. That reality imposes on us a special responsibility to be fair and compassionate to those on whom we impose our rules. Hence the argument for animal rights."

Academic and other disputes

Norman Finkelstein 

Shortly after the publication of Dershowitz's The Case for Israel (2003), Norman Finkelstein of DePaul University said the book contained material plagiarized from Joan Peters's book From Time Immemorial. Dershowitz denied the allegation. Harvard's president, Derek Bok, investigated the allegation and determined that no plagiarism had occurred. Los Angeles attorney Frank Menetrez wrote an article analyzing the dispute's details that supported Finkelstein's charges, concluding: "I don't see how Dershowitz could, purely by coincidence, have precisely reproduced all of Peters' errors [in quoting The Innocents Abroad] if he was working from the original Twain." CounterPunch published Dershowitz's response and Menetrez's reply. Dershowitz dismissed the charges as verifiably false and politically motivated by hostility to his support for Israel, and Menetrez reaffirmed his view that the evidence pointed to Dershowitz having plagiarized his sources.

In October 2006, Dershowitz wrote to DePaul University faculty members to lobby against Finkelstein's application for tenure, accusing Finkelstein of academic dishonesty. The university's Liberal Arts and Sciences faculty voted to send a letter of complaint to Harvard University. In June 2007, DePaul University denied Finkelstein tenure.

Mearsheimer and Walt 

In March 2006, John Mearsheimer, professor of political science at the University of Chicago, and Stephen Walt, professor of international affairs at Harvard Kennedy School, co-wrote a paper titled "The Israel Lobby and U.S. Foreign Policy", published in The London Review of Books. Mearsheimer and Walt criticized what they called "the Israel lobby" for influencing U.S. foreign policy in the Middle East in a direction away from U.S. interests and toward Israel's. They referred to Dershowitz specifically as an "apologist" for the Israel lobby. In a March 2006 interview with The Harvard Crimson, Dershowitz called the article "one-sided" and its authors "liars" and "bigots". The next day, on MSNBC's Scarborough Country, he suggested the paper had been derived from multiple hate sites: "Every paragraph virtually is copied from a neo-Nazi Web site, from a radical Islamic Web site, from David Duke's Web site." Dershowitz subsequently wrote a report challenging the paper, arguing that it contained "three types of major errors: Quotations are wrenched out of context, important facts are misstated or omitted, and embarrassingly weak logic is employed." In a letter in the London Review of Books in May 2006, Mearsheimer and Walt denied that they had used any racist sources for their article, writing that Dershowitz had failed to offer any evidence to support his claim.

Defamation lawsuits
Beginning in 2015, Dershowitz was involved in a series of defamation lawsuits and countersuits over allegations that he engaged in sexual misconduct. The suits were settled in 2022 with his accuser, Virginia Giuffre, saying, "I now recognize I may have made a mistake in identifying Mr. Dershowitz". In a December 30, 2014, Florida court filing, Giuffre alleged she was sexually trafficked by Jeffrey Epstein, who lent her to people for sex, including Dershowitz and Prince Andrew. The motion claimed that Dershowitz was also an eyewitness to the sexual abuse of other minors. Giuffre's affidavit was included in a 2008 lawsuit filed on behalf of women who say they were sexually abused by Epstein; the lawsuit accused the Justice Department of violating the Crime Victims Rights Act by entering into a plea agreement with Epstein that allowed him to serve jail time on state charges but avoid federal prosecution.

In the week after the release of Giuffre's affidavit, Dershowitz denied the allegations and sought disbarment of the lawyers filing the suit. That same week of January 2015, Giuffre's lawyers, Bradley Edwards and Paul G. Cassell, sued Dershowitz for defamation. By early April 2015, U.S. District Court Judge Kenneth Marra had the allegations against Dershowitz and Andrew removed from the record as having no bearing on the 2008 lawsuit seeking to reopen Epstein's case. Dershowitz countersued Edwards and Cassell in 2015, and the two parties settled for an undisclosed sum by April 2016.

In February 2019, Marra ruled that prosecutors had violated the Crime Victims Rights Act. In April 2019, Giuffre filed a defamation lawsuit in the Southern District of New York against Dershowitz, alleging he had made "false and malicious defamatory statements" about her, such as accusing her of perjury. The lawsuit sought punitive damages and included the previous claims that Epstein sex-trafficked Giuffre to Dershowitz. Dershowitz said that he would "prove without any doubt that she is lying about me. She is going to end up in prison."

In June 2019, Dershowitz filed a motion to dismiss Giuffre's suit (which was later denied) and a motion to disqualify David Boies's firm from representing her (which was later approved). In November 2019, Dershowitz filed a countersuit against Giuffre and accused Boies of pressuring Giuffre to provide false testimony, in response to which Boies sued Dershowitz in November 2019 for defamation. In the November 2019 lawsuit, Dershowitz alleged that Giuffre had "falsely and with a knowing and reckless disregard of falsity and acting out of ill-will and spite publicly labelled Dershowitz as a child rapist and molester." In a July 31, 2020 interview, Dershowitz said, "I never met her. I never saw her."

Giuffre repeated her allegations on camera as part of the May 2020 Netflix series Jeffrey Epstein: Filthy Rich, and stated that Epstein had trafficked her to Dershowitz for sex at least six times. In response, Dershowitz repeated his denial of Giuffre's account and accused her of selling false allegations to news outlets.

In addition to the 2019 litigation filed by Giuffre and Dershowitz against each other for defamation in federal court in New York, Dershowitz also filed a defamation lawsuit in U.S. Federal District Court in Miami against Netflix and the producers of Jeffery Epstein: Filthy Rich in May 2021. In 2022, Giuffre, Dershowitz and Boies jointly announced that they had settled their respective lawsuits. Giuffre said that, given the traumatic circumstances of being trafficked by Epstein and her age, she realized that her identification of Dershowitz might have been a mistake. Dershowitz said that his assertion that Boies had engaged in an extortion plot and in suborning perjury was mistaken.

Family and personal life 
Dershowitz's first wife was Sue Barlach. In his book Chutzpah, he described Barlach as an "Orthodox Jewish girl." The two met during high school at a Jewish summer camp in the Catskills. They married in 1959, when Dershowitz was 20 and Barlach was 18. Barlach and Dershowitz had two sons together: Elon Dershowitz (born 1961), a film producer, and Jamin Dershowitz (born 1963), an attorney. Barlach and Dershowitz separated in 1973 and divorced in 1976. Although Barlach was initially given custody, Dershowitz fought for and was later awarded full custody of their children. During the divorce proceedings, Barlach alleged that Dershowitz physically abused her, resulting in the need for medical treatment and therapy. The New Yorker reported that Barlach later worked as a research librarian and "drowned in the East River, in an apparent suicide" on December 31, 1983.

In 1986, Dershowitz married Carolyn Cohen, a retired neuropsychologist, Together they had one child, Ella (born 1990), an actress. Dershowitz and Cohen divide their time between homes in Martha's Vineyard, Miami Beach and Manhattan.

Jamin Dershowitz married Barbara, a Roman Catholic, which helped prompt Alan Dershowitz to write The Vanishing American Jew, dedicated to them and their children, whom Dershowitz regards as Jewish. He has two grandchildren by Jamin: Lori and Lyle.

Dershowitz is related to Los Angeles Conservative rabbi Zvi Dershowitz.

Awards and recognitions 
Dershowitz was named a Guggenheim Fellow in 1979, and in 1983 received the William O. Douglas First Amendment Award from the Anti-Defamation League for his work on civil rights. In November 2007, he was awarded the Soviet Jewry Freedom Award by the Russian Jewish Community Foundation. In December 2011, he was awarded the Menachem Begin Award of Honor by the Menachem Begin Heritage Center at an event co-sponsored by NGO Monitor. He has been awarded honorary doctorates in law from Yeshiva University, the Hebrew Union College, Monmouth University, University of Haifa, Syracuse University, Fitchburg State College, Bar-Ilan University, and Brooklyn College. He is a member of the International Advisory Board of NGO Monitor.

Dershowitz has appeared as himself in the television series Picket Fences, Spin City, and First Monday, and in the 2019 documentary No Safe Spaces.

In popular culture
In the film Reversal of Fortune (1990), Dershowitz was portrayed by Ron Silver.

Evan Handler portrays Dershowitz in the 2016 television series The People v. O. J. Simpson: American Crime Story.

Works 

 1982: The Best Defense. .
 1985: Reversal of Fortune: Inside the von Bülow Case. .
 1988: Taking Liberties: A Decade of Hard Cases, Bad Laws, and Bum Raps. .
 1991: Chutzpah. .
 1992: Contrary to Popular Opinion. .
 1994: The Advocate's Devil (fiction). .
 1994: The Abuse Excuse: And Other Cop-Outs, Sob Stories, and Evasions of Responsibility. .
 1996: Reasonable Doubts: The Criminal Justice System and the O.J. Simpson Case. .
 1997: The Vanishing American Jew: In Search of Jewish Identity for the Next Century. .
 1998: Sexual McCarthyism: Clinton, Starr, and the Emerging Constitutional Crisis. .
 1999: Just Revenge (fiction). .
 2000: The Genesis of Justice: Ten Stories of Biblical Injustice that Led to the Ten Commandments and Modern Law. Warner Books. .
 2001: Letters to a Young Lawyer. Basic Books. .
 2001: Supreme Injustice: How the High Court Hijacked Election 2000. Oxford University Press. .
 2002: Why Terrorism Works: Understanding the Threat, Responding to the Challenge. Yale University Press. .
 2002: Shouting Fire: Civil Liberties in a Turbulent Age. Little Brown. .
 2003: The Case for Israel. John Wiley & Sons. 
 2003: America Declares Independence. John Wiley & Sons. .
 2004: America on Trial: Inside the Legal Battles That Transformed Our Nation. Warner Books. .
 2004: Rights From Wrongs: A Secular Theory of the Origins of Rights. .
 2005: The Case for Peace: How the Arab-Israeli Conflict Can be Resolved. John Wiley & Sons. ; ;.
 2006: Preemption: A Knife That Cuts Both Ways. W.W. Norton & Company. .
 2007: Blasphemy: How the Religious Right is Hijacking the Declaration of Independence. . 
 2007: Finding Jefferson: A Lost Letter, a Remarkable Discovery, and the First Amendment in an Age of Terrorism. . 
 2008: Is There a Right to Remain Silent?: Coercive Interrogation and the Fifth Amendment After 9/11. .
 2008: The Case Against Israel's Enemies: Exposing Jimmy Carter and Others Who Stand in the Way of Peace. .
 2009: Mouth of Webster, Head of Clay essay in The Face in the Mirror: Writers Reflect on Their Dreams of Youth and the Reality of Age. .
 2009: The Case For Moral Clarity: Israel, Hamas and Gaza. .
 2010: The Trials of Zion. .
 2013: Taking the Stand: My Life in the Law. .
 2014: Terror Tunnels: The Case for Israel's Just War Against Hamas. .
 2015: Abraham: The World's First (But Certainly Not Last) Jewish Lawyer (Jewish Encounters Series). .
 2016: Electile Dysfunction: A Guide for Unaroused Voters. .
 2017:  Trumped Up: How Criminalization of Political Differences Endangers Democracy. .
 2018: The Case Against Impeaching Trump. .
 2018: The Case Against BDS: Why Singling Out Israel for Boycott is Anti-Semitic. (self-published), .
 2019: Defending Israel: The Story of My Relationship with My Most Challenging Client. .
 2019: Guilt by Accusation: The Challenge of Proving Innocence in the Age of #MeToo. .
 2020: Cancel Culture: The Latest Attack on Free Speech and Due Process. .
 2021: The Case Against the New Censorship: Protecting Free Speech from Big Tech, Progressives, and Universities.

Further reading

 Rice, Andrew. "Alan Dershowitz Cannot Stop Talking. Accused of a slew of terrible things, the defense has no intention of resting." New York Magazine. July 19, 2019. 
 Bruck, Connie, "Devil's Advocate: Alan Dershowitz's long, controversial career – and the accusations against him", The New Yorker, August 5 & 12, 2019, pp. 32–47.

See also
 List of law clerks of the Supreme Court of the United States (Seat 2)

References

External links

 
1938 births
Academic scandals
Activists from New York (state)
American Civil Liberties Union people
American civil rights lawyers
American legal scholars
American legal writers
American Zionists
Animal rights scholars
Brooklyn College alumni
CNN people
Criminal defense lawyers
Harvard Law School faculty
Historians of Israel
Academic staff of Reichman University
Jeffrey Epstein
Jewish American academics
Jewish American attorneys
Jewish American writers
Law clerks of the Supreme Court of the United States
Living people
New York (state) Democrats
New York (state) lawyers
Newsmax TV people
O. J. Simpson murder case
People from Borough Park, Brooklyn
People from Williamsburg, Brooklyn
People involved in plagiarism controversies
Scholars of antisemitism
Secular Jews
Writers from Brooklyn
Writers on Zionism
Yale Law School alumni
Members of the defense counsel for the first impeachment trial of Donald Trump